Beach soccer has been part of each edition of the European Games – a quadrennial, multi-sport event – since the inaugural edition in 2015 as a men's sport. The competition is under the direction of the European Olympic Committees (EOCs); beach soccer's governing bodies (FIFA and UEFA) are represented by Beach Soccer Worldwide (BSWW) at the Games.

Eight teams take part. The hosts qualify automatically; of the most recent edition of the Euro Beach Soccer League (EBSL), the top six teams of the Superfinal and winners of the Promotion Final also qualify. To participate, nations must be members of both the EOCs and UEFA.

Portugal are most successful nation having won a total of two medals (one gold, one bronze).

Results

Performance

Medal table

Overall standings
As of 2019

Key:
Appearances App / Won in Normal Time W = 3 Points / Won in Extra Time W+ = 2 Points / Won in Penalty shoot-out WP = 1 Point / Lost L = 0 Points

Appearances & performance timeline 
Key

 – Champions
 – Runners-up
 – Third place
 – Fourth place

5th–10th — Fifth to tenth place
 — Did not qualify
 – Hosts
Apps — Total appearances

See also
Beach soccer at the African Beach Games
Beach soccer at the Asian Beach Games
Beach soccer at the South American Beach Games

References

External links
Beach Soccer Worldwide, official website

 
European Games